Nick Mason's Fictitious Sports is the debut solo album by Pink Floyd drummer Nick Mason, released in May 1981 in the UK and the US. It was Mason's first major work outside of Pink Floyd. It is sung by Robert Wyatt (formerly of Soft Machine), except for the opening song. All the songs were written by Carla Bley. The album (along with Profiles and the soundtrack to the film White of the Eye) was remastered and reissued on August 31, 2018 as part of the box set Unattended Luggage.

Recording
The album was recorded in October 1979 but its release was delayed for almost two years.

Track listing 
All songs written by Carla Bley.

Side one
 "Can't Get My Motor to Start" – 3:39
 "I Was Wrong" – 4:12
 "Siam" – 4:48
 "Hot River" – 5:16

Side two
"Boo to You Too" – 3:26
 "Do Ya?" – 4:36
 "Wervin'" – 3:58
 "I'm a Mineralist" – 6:16

Personnel
 Nick Mason – drums, percussion, co-producer, assistant recording engineer 
 Carla Bley – keyboards, songwriter, co-producer
 Robert Wyatt – vocals (except on "Can't Get My Motor to Start")
 Karen Kraft – lead vocal on "Can't Get My Motor to Start", duet vocal on "Hot River", backing vocals
 Chris Spedding – guitars
 Steve Swallow – bass guitar
 Michael Mantler – trumpets, recording engineer
 Gary Windo – tenor, bass clarinet, flute, additional voices
 Gary Valente – trombones, additional voices
 Howard Johnson – tuba
 Terry Adams – piano on "Boo to You Too", harmonica & clavinet on "Can't Get My Motor to Start"
 Carlos Ward – additional voices
 David Sharpe – additional voices
 Vincent Chancey – additional voices
 Earl McIntyre – additional voices
 James Guthrie – mixing engineer
 Hipgnosis and Geoff Halpin – cover design

References 

1981 debut albums
Jazz fusion albums by English artists
Jazz fusion albums by American artists
Harvest Records albums
EMI Records albums
Columbia Records albums
Albums produced by Nick Mason
Carla Bley albums
Nick Mason albums
Albums with cover art by Hipgnosis